Karwaan is a 2018 Indian Hindi-language road comedy-drama film written by Bejoy Nambiar and directed by debutant Akarsh Khurana, and produced by Ronnie Screwvala and Priti Rathi Gupta. The film stars Dulquer Salmaan with Irrfan Khan, and Mithila Palkar. It marks the Bollywood debut of Salmaan. It was released on 3 August 2018 and received mixed-to-positive reviews from critics.

Plot 
Avinash Rajpurohit works for an IT company in Bengaluru. He is dissatisfied with his job and his boss, and was forced into it by his father Prakash, whom he did not have a good relationship with, and who was unsupportive of Avinash's passion for photography. One night a travel agency calls him to inform him that his father has died in a bus accident while travelling Gangotri, and that the body will be dispatched to him. He takes delivery of a corpse and hands it over to his van driver friend Shaukat. As they are about to cremate it, they discover that it is the body of an old woman. Avinash is informed that the corpse with him is that of the mother of Tahira, a widow who lives in Kochi, and that Prakash's corpse and personal effects are with her. The two decide to travel to Kochi to exchange the corpses.

Avinash and Shaukat set out when Tahira calls them, saying that her teenage daughter Tanya has gone incommunicado, possibly due to shock after hearing her grandmother's news. They go to Tanya's college in Ooty, where Avinash meets her trying to leave the hostel. Initially she is aloof and irritable, angering Shaukat, but he agrees to take her along. En route, they discover that along with the corpse is a box containing the personal effects of Latha Nambiar of Kottayam, who was also killed in the accident, but are told there that Latha's niece is getting married in Kumarakom. At the wedding, as Avinash and Tanya spend time with the groom, a gang of goons, which had been demanding payment from Shaukat for long, make off with his van. Avinash, Shaukat and Tanya—along with the wedding's aged shehnai-player, who impressed Shaukat—chase it but in vain.

Shaukat and the shehnai-player are admitted to a hospital, where Shaukat falls in love with a young woman, but is dismayed to find that she is the shehnai-player's wife. Meanwhile Avinash and Tanya spend time at an inn, but when Tanya picks up a pregnancy test at a chemist's, they start an argument over her morals and she leaves for the hospital. There they come across Avinash's doctor friend Raghu, who takes them to his home, where Avinash rekindles a long-lost friendship with Raghu's wife Rumana. The next day, at the police station, Avinash, Shaukat and Tanya find their van wrecked, but in its place is a new car. They go to the gang's hideout on the pretext of repaying their dues, but flee when the goons arrive. Later Shaukat shares with Avinash and Tanya his experiences of him and his mother being tortured by his late father, at which they all agree that their fathers' lives and deaths have caused them great suffering.

The three reach Kochi where Tahira warmly welcomes them. That evening Avinash discovers in his father's diary that he actually wanted Avinash to retire from his job and take up photography full-time, but could not talk to him out of Avinash's resentment for him. At the prayer meet later that evening in memory of both Tahira's mother and Prakash, Tahira and Avinash make speeches for the two deceased people, who are then cremated. They spend the night at Tahira's, making merry with her friends and family. The next day Shaukat finds out that Tasneem, the shehnai-player's young wife, has been tortured by her aged husband; she asks to divorce him and Shaukat takes her along with the others back to Bengaluru. An inspired Avinash walks out of his job and starts a life of freedom with his new friends.

Cast

 Irrfan Khan as Shaukat
 Dulquer Salmaan as Avinash Rajpurohit
 Mithila Palkar as Tanya
 Kriti Kharbanda as Rumana Salim (Cameo appearance)
 Sameer Saxena as Doctor Raghu, Rumana's husband
 Amala Akkineni as Tahira Moidenkutty
 Akash Khurana as Prakash Rajpurohit
 Bina as Tahira's mother
 Nipun Dharmadhikari as Amey, Avinash's colleague at his white-collar job
 Donna Munshi as Tasneem
 Rohit Dandwani as Office Employee
 Abir Abrar as Avinash's neighbour
 Boloram Das as Cargo officer
 Sarang Sathaye as Sanjay
 Adhaar Khurana as Rahul
 Shubrajyoti Barat as Nambiar
 Ambika Mohan as Latha Nambiar
 Adrika Shetty as Laxmi
 Habib Azmi as Aziz Hussain 
 Siddharth Menon as Rajat, the groom at the wedding (cameo appearance)

Production

Development

In August 2013, it was reported that Akarsh Khurana would be making his directorial debut with a dramedy written by Bejoy Nambiar, the story of which would revolve around three characters, going on a road trip. Initially it was reported that Arvind Swamy and Nawazuddin Siddiqui would be playing two of the three lead characters, but in May 2014 Bejoy Nambiar informed that as a result of modifications made in the script, Arvind Swamy would not be part of the project and Rajkummar Rao had been brought in to do the film which was titled Focus at that time. In June 2014, when the film was one month away from going on floors, director Akarsh Khurana opted out of the project owing to creative differences with Bejoy Nambiar, the writer and producer of the film. Bejoy Nambiar brought in Heeraz Marfatia as a replacement for Akarsh Khurana but the shooting of the film failed to take off and after several delays Bejoy decided to postpone the project for a year so as to focus on his own directorial venture Wazir.

In April 2017, it was reported that Ronnie Screwvala had decided to revive Bejoy Nambiar's Focus through his new production house RSVP Films and Akarsh Khurana had been brought back to direct the film with Irrfan Khan and Abhishek Bachchan in lead roles. In June 2017, Abhishek Bachchan parted ways with the film because the shooting schedule was clashing with that of Paltan, another project of his that he was doing with J.P. Dutta. In August 2017, Akarsh Khurana informed that Dulquer Salmaan and Mithila Palkar had been finalized to play the central characters in the film along with Irrfan Khan. On 1 September 2017 the first look of the film was unveiled, through which it was revealed that the film had been given the name Karwan.

Filming

Principal photography of the film started from 31 August 2017. The film was shot in Ooty and Kochi.

Soundtrack

The soundtrack of Karwaan consists of songs composed by Prateek Kuhad, Anurag Saikia, SlowCheetah, Shwetang Shankar and Imaad Shah with lyrics been written by Prateek Kuhad, Akarsh Khurana, SlowCheetah and Imaad Shah as per the official trailer of the film unveiled on 27 June 2018 on YouTube.

Release
The film was released worldwide on 3 August 2018.

Critical reception
The film mostly received mixed to positive reviews.
The Hindustan Times rated 4 out of 5 and praised the acting of Irrfan Khan, Dulquer Salmaan and Mithila Palkar. Filmfare rated 4.1 out of 5 and said "Watch the film for the fine acting by Mithila and Irfan. This comedy will surely tickle your funny bone and would make you reflect on life as well". Times of India rated 3.5 out of 5 and said "Karwaan might not live up to the expectations, but it leaves a warm fuzzy feeling in the heart that says all's well that ends well". Aavishkar Gawande gave the film 3.5 stars out of 5 and called it a well made slice-of-life film. He also praised Irrfan Khan's performance. DNA India rated 3 out 5 and said "Irrfan Khan's film oscillates between being a fun-ride and a dark-drag". The rating from Firstpost was 2.5 and mentioned Dulquer and Irrfan are absolute dears in a sweetly understated road flick.

Box office
The film had a below average opening with 5 – 8 percent occupancy, it grossed ₹15 million worldwide on day-1. Karwaan grossed a total of ₹246.4 million from India and ₹17.8 million overseas for a worldwide total of ₹264.2 million in its lifetime. The film was made on a budget of ₹230 million.

Awards and nominations

References

External links 
 
 

2018 films
2010s road comedy-drama films
Indian road comedy-drama films
2010s Hindi-language films
Films shot in Kerala
Films shot in Kochi
Films shot in Ooty
2018 directorial debut films
2018 comedy-drama films
Films directed by Akarsh Khurana
Indian drama road movies